Phryneta verrucosa is a species of beetle in the family Cerambycidae. It was described by Dru Drury in 1773, originally under the genus Cerambyx. It is known from Equatorial Guinea, and was introduced into Barbados, Grenada, and Trinidad and Tobago.

References

Phrynetini
Beetles described in 1773
Taxa named by Dru Drury